The eschaton is a time period described in eschatological writings and doomsday scenarios.

Eschaton may also refer to:

Eschaton (album), a 2006 album by Anaal Nathrakh
Ezkaton, a 2008 EP by the band Behemoth
Eschaton, a 2016 deck-building strategy board game published by Archon Games
Eschaton, a single released in 2017 by the indie folk band Darlingside
Eschaton, a fictional artificial intelligence entity in the Charles Stross novels Singularity Sky and Iron Sunrise
 Eschaton, a liberal weblog written by Duncan B. Black under the pseudonym of Atrios
Eschaton trilogy, a trilogy of science fiction novels by Frederik Pohl
Eschaton, a fictional geopolitical game played on four contiguous tennis courts, from the David Foster Wallace novel Infinite Jest
Escaton, the primary antagonist in the videogame Might and Magic VIII: Day of the Destroyer

See also
End time (disambiguation)